Penicillium siamense is an anamorph species of fungus in the genusPenicillium which was isolated from forest soil in Thailand.

References

Further reading 
 
 

siamense
Fungi described in 1988